Victor Fray (born 18 August 1946) is a Jamaican cricketer. He played in eleven first-class matches for the Jamaican cricket team from 1965 to 1970.

See also
 List of Jamaican representative cricketers

References

External links
 

1946 births
Living people
Jamaican cricketers
Jamaica cricketers
Sportspeople from Kingston, Jamaica